Czarna Góra (Polish for "black mountain") may refer to:

Czarna Góra, Lesser Poland Voivodeship (south Poland)
Czarna Góra, Puck County in Pomeranian Voivodeship (north Poland)
Czarna Góra, Wejherowo County in Pomeranian Voivodeship (north Poland)
Czarna Góra, Warmian-Masurian Voivodeship (north Poland)
Czarna Góra Ski Resort, near Sienna, Lower Silesian Voivodeship (south Poland)

See also
 Černá Hora (disambiguation)
 Schwarzenberg (disambiguation)
 Montenegro (disambiguation)
 Black Mountain (disambiguation)